Scopula timia is a moth of the  family Geometridae. It is found in Kenya.

References

Moths described in 1916
timia
Moths of Africa